The Portland Trail Blazers Radio Network is an American radio network consisting of 18 radio stations which carry coverage of the National Basketball Association (NBA)'s Portland Trail Blazers.

The Radio Network has one flagship station (KPOJ) and 17 affiliate stations in Oregon and Washington. Travis Demers is the play-by-play announcer and former Trail Blazer Michael Holton is the color analyst for home games.  Jay Allen is studio host.  Rich Patterson is the network producer.


Station list

References

External links
 

Mass media in Portland, Oregon
National Basketball Association on the radio
Portland Trail Blazers
Sports radio networks in the United States